Ginés Salmerón (born 15 November 1972) is a Spanish racing cyclist. He rode in the 1999 Tour de France.

Major results
1997
 1st Stage 3 Vuelta a Andalucía
1998
 3rd Clásica de Sabiñánigo
 6th Overall Vuelta a Andalucía
1999
 6th Overall Étoile de Bessèges
 9th Overall Vuelta a Murcia
 9th Gran Premio Miguel Induráin

Grand Tour general classification results timeline

References

External links
 

1972 births
Living people
Spanish male cyclists
Place of birth missing (living people)
Sportspeople from Sabadell
Cyclists from Catalonia
20th-century Spanish people